Euseius vignus is a species of mite in the family Phytoseiidae.

References

vignus
Articles created by Qbugbot
Animals described in 1983